The 2022 Delray Beach Open (officially known as 2022 Delray Beach Open by VITACOST.com for sponsorship reasons) was a professional men's tennis tournament played on hard courts. It was the 30th edition of the tournament, and it was part of the 2022 ATP Tour. It took place in Delray Beach, United States between February 14 and February 20, 2022. This was the first edition where an exhibition mixed doubles event was played.

Champions

Singles

  Cameron Norrie def.  Reilly Opelka, 7–6(7–1), 7–6(7–4)

Doubles

  Marcelo Arévalo /  Jean-Julien Rojer def.  Aleksandr Nedovyesov /  Aisam-ul-Haq Qureshi, 6–2, 6–7(5–7), [10–4]

Point and prize money

Point distribution

Prize money 

*per team

Singles main-draw entrants

Seeds 

† Rankings are as of 7 February 2022.

Other entrants
The following players received wildcards into the main draw:
  Grigor Dimitrov
  Tommy Paul
  Jack Sock

The following players received entry from qualifying draw:
  Liam Broady
  Denis Istomin
  Stefan Kozlov
  Mitchell Krueger

The following player received entry as a lucky loser :
  Emilio Gómez

Withdrawals
 Before the tournament
  Jenson Brooksby → replaced by  Emilio Gómez
  James Duckworth → replaced by  Thanasi Kokkinakis
  Kei Nishikori → replaced by  Steve Johnson
  Frances Tiafoe → replaced by  Denis Kudla

Doubles main-draw entrants

Seeds 

 1 Rankings are as of 7 February 2022.

Other entrants 
The following pairs received wildcards into the main draw:
  Robert Galloway /  Alex Lawson
  Thanasi Kokkinakis /  Jordan Thompson

The following pair received entry into the doubles main draw as alternates:
  Jack Vance /  Jamie Vance

Withdrawals
Before the tournament
  Thanasi Kokkinakis /  Jordan Thompson → replaced by  Jack Vance /  Jamie Vance

References

External links 
Tournament overview on ATP Tour website
Official website

2022 ATP Tour
2022 in American tennis
February 2022 sports events in the United States
2022 in sports in Florida